Hrishikesh Ranade  (born 18 October 1981) is an Indian playback singer in Marathi film industry. He has sung songs in Marathi, Hindi, Konkani and in some other Indian languages. He won Idea Sa Re Ga Ma Pa Maharashtracha Ajacha Awaaj.

Childhood
Hrishikesh is from the music family and his father Pramod Ranade is also a well known Marathi singer. He took initial training from Pandit Vijay Koparkar and Shekhar Kumbhojkar.

Career

He has made performances in television, and various festivals in the light music and film music. Along with singer Shreya Ghoshal he made a stage performance during the 18th annual day celebration of Airports Authority of India in 2013 and sang some of hit songs. Later in  2013, he accompanied Shreya Ghoshal in UK and Europe tour in which they sang at various places in Europe, as a celebration of 100 years of Bollywood. Both gave a tribute to many legendary playback singers of Bollywood. They had a grand performance at the Royal Albert Hall in Westminster, London. On 17 May 2013 both performed at the Sharjah Cricket Association Stadium in United Arab Emirates.
 He accompanied Shreya Ghoshal in the live concert in Infosys DC Pune on 10 January 2015.
 Shaniwarwada festival 
 Mirchi Music Awards Marathi award function

Film singing
He has sung songs in various films. Some of them are - 
 Mumbai-Pune-Mumbai
 Tuzya mazya sansarala aani kay hava
 Ajintha
 Gadhavacha Lagna
 Premachi Goshta
 Ishq Wala Love
 Cheers Marathe
 Ritya Sarya Disha, Double Seat
 Mumbai-Pune-Mumbai 2
  Online Binline
  Double Seat
 Kadhi Tu
Mumbai-Pune-Mumbai 3

Popular songs
 कधी गौर बसंती Kadhi Gaur Basanti   
 कधी तू रिमझिम Kadhi Tu Rimzim  
 जमेल तेव्हा जमेल त्याने Jamel Tevha Jamel Tyane  
 त्या पैलतिरावर मिळेल मजला Tya Pailtiravar Milel Majala  
 मनातल्या मनात मी तुझ्या Manatlya Manat Mi Tujhya  
 या व्याकुळ संध्यासमयीं Tya Vyakul Sandhya Samayi   
 स्वर्ग हा नवा Swarg Ha Nava  
 हे तारांगण गूढ गहन He Tarangan Goodh Gahan
 Tu aanI mi - Krutant

Awards and recognition
 2009: Idea Sa Re Ga Ma Pa Maharashtracha Ajacha Awaaj

Personal life
Hrishikesh Ranade is the elder son of Marathi singer Pramod Ranade. He is married to singer Prajkta Joshi- Ranade and has a daughter.

References

Living people
Bollywood playback singers
Indian male singers
Marathi playback singers
Place of birth missing (living people)
Marathi-language singers
1981 births